Girton may refer to:

 Girton, Cambridgeshire, England
 Girton, Nottinghamshire, England
 Girton College, Cambridge, Cambridgeshire, England
 Girton High School, Mumbai, India
 Girton Grammar School, Bendigo, Victoria, Australia

See also
 Gerton, North Carolina